Latin American School of Medicine could refer to:

Latin American School of Medicine (Cuba)
Latin American School of Medicine A.P. Réverénd (Venezuela)